Wu Bin was a Ming dynasty Chinese landscape painter during the reign of the Wanli Emperor (r. 1573–1620). His courtesy name was "Wenzhong" and his art name "Zhiyin Toutuo" means "Mendicant monk at the temple hidden by tree branches". His specific dates of birth and death are not known. Wu was born in Putian in the Fujian province. The local relation linked  him  to Ōbaku Buddhism sect. He painted a large Nirvana scene painting  for them.

He was educated as one of the literati and skilled as a  painter. He worked  mainly in Nanjing about 1590–1610. He became a devout follower of Buddhism and lived and worked in a Buddhist temple. In Nanjing, he often  depicted Buddhist arhats behaving as magicians, performing superstitious rituals and healing practices to satisfy requests made by religious men and women. These are colorful portraits where irony and sarcasm prevail.  He  produced 500 arhat hanging scrolls in Qixia Temple in Nanjing in about 1601. Some of these hanging scrolls have  survived. It is uncertain whether he worked for the vice imperial government in Nanjing. Mi Wanzong (1570－1628), a high ranking government officer, calligrapher, and painter, was his patron from about ACE1600. Wu Bin moved to Beijing with Mi Wanzong's  support in about 1610.  He  produced several masterpieces for Mi Wanzong in Beijing. The landscape of Mi's Garden in Beijing, Ten portraits  of A marvelous rock which Mi had and appreciated., and some  extravagant landscape paintings.

The Beijing imperial court assigned him the status for a professional technocrat as painter. There are no  records of  him after 1626. Some sources indicate that the powerful and notorious eunuch Wei Zhongxian purged Wu Bin.

Works 

Asian Art Museum, San Francisco
  "Pine Lodge amid Tall Mountains"
Cleveland Museum of Art
 Greeting  the Spring (Landscape Handscroll) in 1600.
 Five Hundred arhat  handscroll
Metropolitan Museum of Art
Sixteen Arhats  Handscroll in 1591 "The 16 Luohans" 
Honolulu Museum of Art
Landscape  Handscroll
Shanghai Museum
Journey in San Yin, handscroll, Ink  and color  on Paper
Palace Museum, Beijing
Arhats

Notes

References
 Chen Yunru,  Fantasic and Extraordinary The Realm of Wu bin's Painting. (Chinese and English text) National Palace Museum, Taipei, Taiwan, 2013
 Howard Rogers and Sherman Lee, Masterworks  of Ming and Qing Paintings from the Forbidden city, International Art Council, USA, 1988
 James Cahill, Wu Pin and His Landscape Painting." Paper for International Conference on Chinese Painting, Palace Museum, Taipei, 1970
 James Cahill: Fantastic and Eccentrics in Chinese Painting, New York, 1972.

Ming dynasty landscape painters
Year of death missing
People from Putian
Painters from Fujian
Year of birth missing
Ming dynasty painters
Buddhist artists